The 2018–19 season was Wycombe Wanderers' 132nd season in existence and their 26th consecutive season in the Football League. This was their first season in EFL League One since the 2011–12 season. They achieved automatic promotion after winning their game against Chesterfield on 28 April 2018 the previous season.

Competitions

Pre-season
Wycombe Wanderers announced on 16 May 2018 that they will face Brentford during their pre-season run-in. On 21 May 2018, two friendlies were announced: the first against Maidenhead United and the second against Havant & Waterlooville. A fourth friendly, a home match against West Ham United, was announced on 12 June. Their final fixture, away to Chesham United, was added on 27 June.

League One

League table

Results summary

Results by matchday

Matches
The EFL League One fixtures were announced on 21 June 2018.

FA Cup

The First Round draw was made on 22 October 2018 at Hitchin Town's home ground Top Field, where Wycombe Wanderers were drawn away to Luton Town.

EFL Cup

The draw for the first round was made on 15 June 2018, in which Wycombe Wanderers were drawn against Northampton Town. After winning their first round tie 7–6 on penalties after drawing 1–1, Wycombe Wanderers were drawn at home to Forest Green Rovers on 16 August 2018. The third round draw was made on 30 August 2018 by David Seaman and Joleon Lescott, and Wycombe were drawn to face Norwich City at home.

EFL Trophy

On 13 July 2018, the initial group stage draw bar the U21 invited clubs was announced.

Team details

Squad information

 Loan player

Appearances and goals

|-
|colspan="14"|Players who left the club before the end of the season:

|}

Transfers

Transfers in

Transfers out

Loans in

Loans out

References

Wycombe Wanderers
Wycombe Wanderers F.C. seasons